Tamassari is a town in western Burkina Faso near Sindou and near the border with Mali.

References

Populated places in the Cascades Region